The Underwater Society of America (USOA) is the peak body for underwater sport and recreational diving in the United States.

Organisation
The USOA is a membership-based organisation consisting of individuals, clubs and regional councils.  Its day-to-day operations are controlled by an executive committee which reports to a board of governors and the delegates of the member councils and clubs.

Origins and history
The USOA was established by a number of regional organisations in 1959 after the founding of Confédération Mondiale des Activités Subaquatiques (CMAS) initially to organise spearfishing teams for international competition.  Prior to its creation, national competition in spearfishing (or skindiving as it was and is still known) and scuba diving was organised by the National Competitive Skindivers Committee of the Amateur Athletic Union (AAU).  The National Competitive Skindivers Committee has previously established in 1954 as an initiative of both the AAU and the International Underwater Spearfishing Association (IUSA) and was the body representing the United States at the foundation of CMAS.

Recognition
The USOA is a member of the following organisations - CMAS with affiliation to the sport, technical and scientific committees, the CMAS American Zone, the Divers Alert Network (DAN), the Diving Equipment and Marketing Association (DEMA) and the United States Olympic Committee (USOC).

Underwater sport
USOA supports competition at all levels within the United States for the following underwater sports: competition scuba, finswimming, freediving, spearfishing, underwater hockey, underwater photography and underwater rugby.  Competition is available at international level for all sports except for competition scuba.

Diver training
As of August 2013, the USOA does not offer diver training.  During 2010, USOA entered in an agreement with the Scuba Educators International (SEI) to permit SEI to issue CMAS International Diver Training Certificates on its behalf.

Awards
The USOA both operates and participates in the following awards and recognition schemes.

It honours its own athletes with the Man & Woman Athlete of the Year being awarded for each sport and with all sports national champions being inducted in the All American Dive Team.  There are also two underwater hockey sportsmanship awards - the Dan Wilkins Memorial Award for the National Championships and the Carl Judd Memorial Award for the Pacific Coast Championships.

The USOA was the original supporter of the NOGI Award which is presumably named after the New Orleans Grand Isle Fishing Tournament which included an underwater section and was created during the 1950s to recognise leaders in all forms of underwater diving.  The NOGI awards scheme is now the responsibility of the Academy of Underwater Arts and Sciences.

In the tradition of the NOGI award, the USOA also recognizes divers within the United States at the regional level with The Regional Divers of the Year Award in the categories of art, sports, education, science and service.

As an affiliate of the United States Olympic Committee (USOC), the USOA is eligible to nominate individuals for the USOC Athlete of the Year.

The USOA also is a joint-founder and a sponsor of the Women Divers Hall of Fame.

International Bluewater Spearfishing Records Committee
The International Bluewater Spearfishing Records Committee (IBSRC) by agreement with the USOA operates as a ‘council of special interest’ within the USOA.  The IBSRC was established in 1996 to promote ‘ethical, safe and sporting spearfishing practices, to establish uniform regulations for the compilation of world-bluewater gamefish records, and to provide basic spearfishing guidelines for use in bluewater contests and any other bluewater spearfishing activities worldwide.’

See also

References

External links
 Underwater Society of America homepage
 USA Finswimming homepage
 USA Underwater Hockey homepage
 USA Underwater Rugby homepage
 International Bluewater Spearfishing Records Committee homepage

Sports governing bodies in the United States
Sports organizations of the United States
Diver organizations
Underwater sports organizations
Finswimming
Underwater hockey governing bodies
Underwater rugby
Sports organizations established in 1959
1959 establishments in the United States
Underwater sport in the United States